The Musha'sha' (also spelled Mosha'sha') were a Shi'i Arab dynasty based in the town of Hoveyzeh in Khuzestan, ruling from 1435 to 1924. Initially starting out as a tribal confederation, they gradually transformed into a zealous Isma'ili-Shi'i dynasty. The independence of the Musha'sha' was put to an end in 1508 by the Safavid shah (king) Ismail I, who claimed to be the only legitimate Shi'i ruler. Following this, the Musha'sha remained compliant, typically serving as valis or governors under Iranian suzerainty for the following centuries.

The Musha'sha' were found and led by Muhammad ibn Falah, an Iraqi-born theologian who believed himself to be the earthly representative of Ali and the Mahdi. From the middle of the 15th century to the 19th century, they came to dominate much of western Khuzestan  in southwestern Iran.

Beginning in 1436, Ibn Falah spread his messianic beliefs amongst the less powerful Arab tribes along the area of the present-day border of Iraq and Iran, gaining converts in an attempt to forge a strong tribal alliance. In 1441, they succeeded in capturing the city of Hoveyzeh in Khuzestan, and during the following ten years the Musha‘sha’iyyah increased their strength and consolidated their power in the area around the city and the Tigris. These early military ambitions were fueled by Muhammad ibn Falah's zealous millenarian theology, which continued to significantly influence the later military campaigns of the Musha‘sha’iyyah decades after his death.

The conflict with the Safavids was driven not only by politics and territorial domination, but also by theological differences and competition between two rival Shi'a schools of thought. According to Moojan Momen, both sects adhered to heterodox (ghuluww) Shi'i beliefs.

According to the order's Islamic eschatology, the Mahdi will appear at the end times in Yemen to lead the forces of good in a struggle against the forces of evil, who will be based in Syria and Greater Khorasan. The Musha‘sha’iyyah believed that the end times were imminent and that they would need to defeat the Safavids and gain control of Iran in order to fulfill the prophecy heralded by ibn Falah.

The Musha‘sha’iyyah gradually abandoned their heretical beliefs and were absorbed to mainstream Twelver Shī‘ah orthodoxy. Like other mystical Shī‘ah sects, they placed a great deal of importance upon poetry and art.

Unreferenced sources indicate that their rule ended towards the 19th century with the rise to power of the Banu Ka'b, which, under the leadership of Jabir al-Kaabi, had become the dominant power in the western region of Iran. However, Momen writes that by the 16th century they were already reduced to being the governors of Khuzestan.

See also
 List of Shi'a Muslim dynasties

References

Further reading
 
 
 
 
 
 

15th century in Iran
15th-century Islam
Shia Islamic branches
History of Khuzestan Province
Safavid Iran